Giovanna Zangrandi (1910–1988) was an Italian novelist and Resistance fighter.

Works
 Leggende delle Dolomiti (Legends of the Dolomites) (1950)
 I Brusaz (The Brusaz Family) (1954)
 Orsola nelle stagioni (Ursula in the Different Seasons) (1957)
 Il campo rosso (The Red Field) (1959) 
 Tre signore (Three Ladies) (1960)
 I giorni veri, 1943–45 (The Real Days, 1943–45) (1963) 
 Anni con Attila (Years with Attila) (1966)
 Il diario di Chiara (Chiara's Diary) (1972)

Further reading
 Penny Morris, ‘A Woman’s Perspective: Autobiography and History in Giovanna Zangrandi’s Resistance Narratives’, in European Memories of the Second World War ed. H. Peitsch, C. Burdett, and C. Gorrara (New York/Oxford: Berghahn Books, 1999), pp. 35–43
 Penny Morris, ‘Giovanna Zangrandi: Negotiating Fascism’, Italian Studies LIII (1998), pp. 94–121

Sources

 Bloomsbury Guide to Women's Literature

Italian resistance movement members
Italian women novelists
1910 births
1988 deaths
20th-century Italian women writers
20th-century Italian novelists